This is a list of Canadian television related events from 1999.

Events

Debuts

Ending this year

Changes of network affiliation

Television shows

1950s
Country Canada (1954–2007)
Hockey Night in Canada (1952–present)
The National (1954–present).

1960s
CTV National News (1961–present)
Land and Sea (1964–present)
Man Alive (1967–2000)
The Nature of Things (1960–present, scientific documentary series)
Question Period (1967–present, news program)
W-FIVE (1966–present, newsmagazine program)

1970s
Canada AM (1972–present, news program)
the fifth estate (1975–present, newsmagazine program)
Marketplace (1972–present, newsmagazine program)
100 Huntley Street (1977–present, religious program)

1980s
CityLine (1987–present, news program)
Fashion File (1989–2009)
Just For Laughs (1988–present)
Midday (1985–2000)
On the Road Again (1987–2007)
Venture (1985–2007)

1990s
 Bob and Margaret (1998–2001)
 Cold Squad (1998–2005)
 Da Vinci's Inquest (1998–2005)
 Daily Planet (1995–present)
 eTalk (1995–present, entertainment newsmagazine program
 Emily of New Moon (1998–2000)
 La Femme Nikita (1997–2001)
 Life and Times (1996–2007)
 Made in Canada (1998–2003)
 Nothing Too Good for a Cowboy (1998-2000)
 The Passionate Eye (1993–present)
 Power Play (1998–2000)
 Riverdale (1997–2000)
 Royal Canadian Air Farce (1993–2008)
 The Red Green Show (1991–2006)
 This Hour Has 22 Minutes (1993–present)
 Traders (1996–2000)
 Twitch City (1998–2000)
 Wind at My Back (1996–2000)
 Witness (1992–2004)

TV moviesMilgaardMy Gentleman FriendsWin, Again!''

See also
 1999 in Canada
 List of Canadian films of 1999

References